Richard Hilton Rand (March 7, 1931 – January 22, 1996) was an American professional baseball catcher who appeared in 72 games in Major League Baseball during all or part of three seasons (and ) for the St. Louis Cardinals and Pittsburgh Pirates.

Rand's pro career stretched over 12 seasons (1949–1959 and 1961). Signed initially by the Cardinals, he had two late-season trials with the Redbirds, collecting 12 hits in 41 at bats (.293) in a dozen games—all of them as the club's starting catcher. St. Louis traded him to Pittsburgh after the 1956 minor-league season, and Rand spent all of 1957 with the Pirates, backing up starting catcher Hank Foiles; he played in 60 contests and started 34 behind the plate. But he batted only .219 and returned to the minors for the rest of his active career.

In the majors, Rand batted .240 lifetime with 35 hits, including three doubles, one triple and two home runs; he had 13 runs batted in.

References

External links

1931 births
1996 deaths
Baseball players from California
Columbus Jets players
Columbus Red Birds players
Dallas Rangers players
Fresno Cardinals players
Houston Buffaloes players
Major League Baseball catchers
Omaha Cardinals players
People from South Gate, California
Pittsburgh Pirates players
Pocatello Cardinals players
Rochester Red Wings players
St. Louis Cardinals players
Winston-Salem Cardinals players